Naraina Village is a village in New Delhi  of India. Naraina village is situated in south west Delhi. 
.

References

Villages in South West Delhi district